Voldoymyr Petrovych Kryzhanivsky (Ukrainian: Володимир Петрович Крижанівський; born on 24 January 1940), is a Ukrainian politician and diplomat who served as the first Ambassador of Ukraine to Russia form 1992 to 1994.

Kryzhanivsky also served as a member of the Verkhovna Rada in the 1st convocation.

He is an expert of the Parliament Assistance Program, author and compiler of manuals published within the framework of the program, teacher of the legislative process for participants of the Internship Program in the Verkhovna Rada of Ukraine. He os a, ember of the Presidium of the society "Vinnichians in Kyiv".

Biography

He was born in a family of civil servants on 24 January 1940 in Vinnytsia.

In 1956, he started as a worker.

In 1958, he was a student and had graduated from the Kyiv Engineering and Construction Institute with a degree in "construction engineer".

In 1963, Vykonrob BMU-18, engineer, senior engineer at BMT-1, in Kyiv.

In 1965, he became the head of the team, engineer, chief specialist, and head of the department of the Institute of the Central Research Institute "Proektstalkonstruktsiya".

In 1984, he became the head of the department of the Institute "Ukr. NII Projectstalkonstruktsiya".

Kryzhanivsky was nominated as a candidate for People's Deputies by the labor collective "UkrNDI proektstalkonstruktionsia". On 19 March 1990, he was elected a member of parliament, a People's Deputy of Ukraine of the Verkhovna Rada, in the 2nd round, with 48.80% of the votes, and 10 applicants. He was a member of the New Ukraine faction, and was the chairman of the subcommittee of the commission of the Verkhovna Rada of Ukraine on human rights.

In 1991, he became the Plenipotentiary representative of Ukraine to Russia.

In 1992, Kryzhanivsky became the first Ambassador of Ukraine to Russia.

In 1994, he became the executive director of MP "Plastic", based in Kyiv.

He was the candidate for the Verkhovna Rada of the XIII convocation; was nominated by the voters 1st round, but got 3.57% of the vote, and resulted in 9th place out of 24 applicants.

He is a member of the NRU, and is one of the founders and a member of the "New Ukraine" association. He is Member of the Presidium of the Society "Vinnytsia in Kyiv".

In 2007–2009, he was the chairman of the association "Vinnytsia in Kyiv".

In 2012, he was a member of the Constitutional Assembly. He is the Vice President of the Association of People's Deputies of Ukraine.

Political views

In January 2015, in an interview with journalists, he criticized the annexation of Crimea to Russia and stated that all ethnic Russians should be expelled from the region.

References

1940 births
Living people